Hayley Erin Feil (born July 13, 1994) is an American actress. She is known for her roles as Abby Newman on The Young and the Restless (2008–2010), Kiki Jerome on General Hospital (2015–2019), for which she won a Daytime Emmy Award, and Taylor Hotchkiss on Pretty Little Liars: The Perfectionists (2019).

Early life
Hayley Erin Feil was born on July 13, 1994 in Los Angeles, California, U.S.

Career
Erin began her career in 2004 when she guest starred on an episode of Malcolm in the Middle. She was also seen on the FOX sketch show MADtv in eight sketches—Celebrity Quarters and a fake movie trailer for It's A Small World as Dakota Fanning. Erin has guest starred on The District, Emily's Reasons Why Not, Two and a Half Men, Modern Family, Austin & Ally and NCIS.

Darcy Rose Byrnes' run as Abby Newman on both The Young and the Restless and The Bold and the Beautiful came to an end in June 2008 when Noah Newman was aged to a teenager, and Abby's character was soon to follow. In December 2008, it was announced that Erin had been cast to portray a teenaged version of the character. In March 2010, it was announced that the character had been rapidly aged again to an adult, with Marcy Rylan scheduled to join the cast. Erin made her final appearance on April 14, with Rylan's debut on May 18, 2010.

In January 2015, it was announced that she had been hired to portray the role of Kiki Jerome on General Hospital, replacing original actress Kristen Alderson in the role.

Erin portrays Taylor Hotchkiss, one of the main characters on the Freeform television series Pretty Little Liars: The Perfectionists.

Personal life
Hayley married Irish actor Adam Fergus in 2020, after announcing their relationship in 2019. They have twin daughters Maude and Juno, born August 2021. The family live in South Dublin.

Filmography

Awards and nominations

References

External links 
 
 
 
 Hayley Erin at TV.com 

1994 births
Living people
21st-century American actresses
Actresses from Los Angeles
American child actresses
American expatriates in Ireland
American soap opera actresses
American television actresses
Daytime Emmy Award winners
Daytime Emmy Award for Outstanding Younger Actress in a Drama Series winners